Two Satyrs is a 1618-1619 oil on canvas painting by Peter Paul Rubens. It measures 76 by 66 cm and is now in the Alte Pinakothek in Munich.

1619 paintings
Mythological paintings by Peter Paul Rubens
Collection of the Alte Pinakothek